St John the Baptist's Church, Longbridge is a parish church in the Church of England in Birmingham.

History

The church was designed by G H While of Bromilow, While and Smeaton. The church was consecrated in 1957 and a parish was formed from St Nicolas' Church, Kings Norton at the same time. It was built to serve the expanding car-making area around the Longbridge plant.

The church is noted for five oak statues on the mullions of the west window designed by G H While and carved by the Robert Pancheri of Bromsgrove. The central figure is of St John the Baptist holding a cross, with a lamb lying on the Bible. Around him are depictions of Elijah with a raven, Isaiah with a branch, Ezekiel with a wheel and Jeremiah with a scroll.

The church was used by the architect as a model for St Boniface's Church, Quinton which was built 2 years later.

Organ

A two manual organ from St Thomas in the Moors, Balsall Heath was installed in 1958 by Nicholson and Co of Worcester. A specification of the organ can be found on the National Pipe Organ Register.

References

Church of England church buildings in Birmingham, West Midlands
Churches completed in 1957
20th-century Church of England church buildings